Green Pine may refer to:

EL/M-2080 Green Pine, electronically scanned radar used by the Israeli military for anti-ballistic missiles
Green Pine (communications), network of low frequency radio transmission sites, used by the Strategic Air Command
Ching Chung Koon (青松觀, "Green Pine Temple"), prominent Taoist temple in Tuen Mun district, Hong Kong. Also have several branch temples with similar name in oversea
Cinema of Turkey (Green Pine)

See also
Pine green, a color